Quisa is a  long river in the province of Bergamo, Lombardy, northern Italy. Its source is located at the foothill of Canto Alto in the municipality of Sorisole; the river subsequently crosses the municipality of Almè, Paladina, Mozzo and Ponte San Pietro where its waters enter in the Brembo.

References 

Rivers of Italy
Rivers of Lombardy
Rivers of the Province of Bergamo